The 1956 Air Force Falcons football team represented the United States Air Force Academy as an independent during the 1956 NCAA University Division football season. The Falcons did not have an official stadium during the season, and remained without one until the 1962 season when Falcon Stadium opened. Led by first-year head coach Buck Shaw, it was the second season for the football program. The Falcons finished with a record of 6–2–1.

Schedule

Personnel

References

Air Force
Air Force Falcons football seasons
Air Force Falcons football